Boneh-ye Cheragh may refer to:
 Boneh-ye Cheragh, Howmeh-ye Gharbi
 Boneh-ye Cheragh, Soltanabad